Lars Peter Riedel (born 28 June 1967, in Zwickau) a former German discus thrower. Riedel has the seventh longest discus throw of all-time with a personal best of 71.50 m.

Riedel began his discus career in the former German Democratic Republic. He grew up in Thurm which is next to Zwickau. In 1983, he went to join SC Karl-Marx-Stadt. His first important competitions were the IAAF World Junior Championship in 1986 and the European Championship in 1990. When the GDR went down Riedel stopped training regularly. Soon after Riedel met his coach Karlheinz Steinmetz from USC Mainz he began training once again. In the 1990s, he became a dominating figure on the German discus scene. With his good physical constitution (1.99 m, 115 kg) he took part in the Olympic Games of Atlanta. There he won his only Olympic title. Furthermore, he won the IAAF World Championship five times.

He is separated from his wife Kerstin. They have a son, Robert.

Achievements 

In addition, he was the German champion 11 times.

References

External links 

 RIEDEL rzutyiskoki.pl 
 
 

1967 births
Living people
People from Zwickau
German male discus throwers
German national athletics champions
Athletes (track and field) at the 1992 Summer Olympics
Athletes (track and field) at the 1996 Summer Olympics
Athletes (track and field) at the 2000 Summer Olympics
Olympic athletes of Germany
World Athletics Championships medalists
European Athletics Championships medalists
Medalists at the 2000 Summer Olympics
Medalists at the 1996 Summer Olympics
Olympic gold medalists for Germany
Olympic silver medalists for Germany
Olympic gold medalists in athletics (track and field)
Olympic silver medalists in athletics (track and field)
World Athletics Championships winners
Sportspeople from Saxony